Yona is a Pali word used to refer to speakers of Greek.

Yona may also refer to:

Places
Yona (Namibe), a commune of Angola
Yona, Burkina Faso, a village in Bana Department, Balé Province, Burkina Faso
Yona, Guam, a village on Guam
Yona, Russia, a rural locality (a selo) in Murmansk Oblast, Russia

People
Jonah, Biblical prophet
Yona Bogale, first leader of the Ethiopian Jewish community in Israel
Yona Ettlinger, Israeli clarinetist
Yona Friedman, Hungarian-born French architect
Yona Kesse, Israeli politician
Yona Kosashvili, Georgian chess grandmaster
Yona Metzger, chief Ashkenazi rabbi of Israel
Yona Reiss, American rabbi
Yona Sabar, Iraqi linguist
Yona Wallach, Israeli poet
Yona Yahav, Israeli lawyer and politician

Other uses
Yona (film), a 2014 Israeli film
"Yona", the word for "hedgehog" in the Lapine language of the novel Watership Down

See also
Yona-Kit, American math rock quartet (1994)
Yona Yona Penguin, 2009 Japanese animated film
Kfar Yona, town in Sharon Subdistrict, Center District, Israel
Akatsuki no Yona, a manga and anime series.